Sport Libolo e Benfica or simply Benfica do Libolo, was an Angolan basketball club based in Libolo, Kwanza Sul province. The club's men's basketball team competed in the Angolan Basketball League as well as at continental level, at the annual African Basketball Club Champions League competitions. In its 76 years of existence, the club won the Angolan League three times, the Angolan Cup five times and the FIBA Africa Clubs Champions Cup once, in 2014.

The club was founded as Clube Recreativo Desportivo do Libolo in 1942. While major local rivals Primeiro de Agosto, Petro de Luanda and Interclube have been competing since the mid 1980s, Libolo basketball, much like its football counterpart even though the club has been founded in the 1940s, (the club has been inoperative for many years due to financial reasons) was only been established in 2008 and yet, in a very short time, managed to achieve an outstanding performance in the local and African arena.

In September 2017, all the clubs assets and ownership rights were passed on to Sport Libolo e Benfica. The club changed its name accordingly. One year later, in September 2018, the basketball team was dissolved due to financial problems after failing to find new sponsors.

Honours

Players

Head coaches

References

External links
 Facebook profile
 Africabasket profile

Defunct basketball teams in Angola
Basketball teams established in 2008
Basketball teams disestablished in 2018
2008 establishments in Angola
2018 disestablishments in Angola